The 2011 Camparini Gioielli Cup – Trofeo pompea was a professional tennis tournament played on outdoor clay courts. It was part of the 2011 ITF Women's Circuit. It took place in Reggio Emilia, Italy between 9 and 15 May 2011.

WTA entrants

Seeds

 Rankings are as of May 2, 2011.

Other entrants
The following players received wildcards into the singles main draw:
  Bianca Botto
  Giulia Gatto-Monticone
  Monica Puig
  Federica Quercia

The following players received entry from the qualifying draw:
  Ana Clara Duarte
  Claudia Giovine
  Sina Haas
  Anne Schäfer

The following players received entry by a lucky loser spot:
  Maria Elena Camerin
  Evelyn Mayr

Champions

Singles

 Sloane Stephens def.  Anastasiya Yakimova, 6–3, 6–1

Doubles

 Sophie Ferguson /  Sally Peers def.  Claudia Giovine /  María Irigoyen, 6–4, 6–1.

References

External links
Official website
ITF search 

Camparini Gioielli Cup - Trofeo Pompea
Clay court tennis tournaments
Tennis tournaments in Italy
Camparini Gioielli Cup
2011 in Italian tennis